Richard Bowyer (died 12 May 1471) was a Canon of Windsor from 1459–1471

Career
He was appointed:
Rector of Chingford, Essex
Prebendary of Morehall in the collegiate church of Gnosall 1452–1461
Rector of St Mildred Poultry 1455–1471
Chaplain within the Household.

He was appointed to the fifth stall in St George's Chapel, Windsor Castle in 1459, a position he held until 1471.

Notes 

1471 deaths
Canons of Windsor
Year of birth missing